is a former Japanese football player.

Playing career
Sugiyama was born in Shizuoka Prefecture on March 24, 1976. After dropped out from Takushoku University, he joined J1 League club JEF United Ichihara in 1997. He debuted in April and played many matches as substitute forward. In 1998, he moved to Japan Football League club Omiya Ardija. He retired end of 1998 season.

Club statistics

References

External links

1976 births
Living people
Takushoku University alumni
Association football people from Shizuoka Prefecture
Japanese footballers
J1 League players
Japan Football League (1992–1998) players
JEF United Chiba players
Omiya Ardija players
Association football forwards